Rola may refer to:
Rola (name)
 Rola coat of arms, a Polish coat of arms
 RoLa, an abbreviation of Rollende Landstrasse (English Rolling highway – a form of transport in which freight trains carry road trucks)
 Rola Cola, a carbonated soft drink created by Carlo Dini in 1979
 Rola (model), Japanese fashion model

See also 
 Rolla (disambiguation)
 Rola bola